Vedhala Ulagam is a 1948 Indian Tamil-language fantasy film directed and produced by A. V. Meiyappan, and written by P. Neelakantan. Adapted from the play of the same name by Pammal Sambandha Mudaliar, the film stars T. R. Mahalingam, K. Sarangapani, Mangalam, K. R. Chellam and C. T. Rajakantham. It was released on 11 August 1948 and became a commercial success.

Plot 
Rajasimhan has spent time with his companion, Dhathan. One day he goes into the queen's puja room and looks at the book of Demon World. In it, the demon king gives three orders and that if one fulfilled these orders, he would give them his kingdom and his young daughter Rajeevi. Rajasimhan is fascinated by the image of Rajeevi in the book. Rajasimhan learns from his mother that his father went to the demon world 18 years ago and was cursed when he tried to rescue all of the men who did not fulfill the king's orders. With his mother's permission, Rajasimhan goes with Dhathan to the demon world to rescue his father. With Rajeevi's help, she and Rajasimhan meet. The demon queen, Komati Devi sends Rajeevi into the torture chamber to save Rajasimhan. Rajasimhan and Dhathan are given one order after another.

Cast 

Male cast
 T. R. Mahalingam as Rajasimhan
 K. Sarangapani as Dhathan
 R. Balasubramaniam as Mahendran
 G. M. Basheer as Commander
 Kulathu Mani as Vedhala Leader
 M. Vishwanathan as Kannan
 D. B. Ramachandran as Arjunan
 D. B. Bhairavan

Female cast
 Mangalam as Rajeevi(Yoga-Mangalam)
 K. R. Chellam as Mohanavalli
 C. T. Rajakantham as Komathi
 B. Chandra as Kumudasundari
 Pandari Bai as Kali Devi
 A. S. Jaya
 Kanthimathi

Dances by
 Baby Rhadha as Radhai
 Kumari Kamala
 Lalitha-Padmini
 Thara Chowdry

Production 

Vedhala Ulagam was adapted by P. Neelakantan from the fantasy play of the same name written by Pammal Sambandha Mudaliar. The film was entirely shot at AVM Studios, with sets built by A. Balu. Some parts of the film were shot with T. A. Jayalakshmi, but she was ultimately replaced by Mangalam of the Yoga-Mangalam dancer duo. The dance sequence of Kumari Kamala, Lalitha, Padmini and Tara Choudary was choreographed by Vazhuvoor Ramaiah Pillai. While the film was predominantly black and white, the last sequence was hand-tinted in colour. Cinematography was handled by T. Muthusamy, and editing by M. V. Raman.

Soundtrack 
The soundtrack was composed by R. Sudarasanam and lyrics written by Mahakavi Subramaniya Bharathiyar, K. D. Santhanam, Papanasam Sivan and N. Raghavan. The song "Ayyaya Paarkka Kannu Koosuthey" is based on the Brazilian singer Carmen Miranda's "I, Yi, Yi, Yi, Yi (I Like You Very Much)". Four poems by Bharathiyar were also featured in the film: "Kalviyil Sirantha Thamizh Nadu", "Thoondir Puzhuvinai Pol", "Odi Vilayadu Pappa" and "Theeratha Villayattu Pillai".

Release and reception 
Vedhala Ulagam was released on 11 August 1948. The last sequence in colour drew large crowds because such coloured sequences in Tamil films were rarities then, and the film became a commercial success.

References

External links 

1940s dance films
1940s fantasy comedy films
1940s Tamil-language films
1948 comedy films
1948 films
AVM Productions films
Indian black-and-white films
Films scored by R. Sudarsanam
Indian dance films
Indian fantasy comedy films
Indian films based on plays
Indian historical fantasy films
Indian musical fantasy films